First United Methodist Church (also called First Methodist Episcopal Church) is a historic church at 2712 Louisa Street in Catlettsburg, Kentucky.

It was built in 1867 and added to the National Register of Historic Places in 1974.

See also
National Register of Historic Places listings in Kentucky

References

United Methodist churches in Kentucky
Churches on the National Register of Historic Places in Kentucky
National Register of Historic Places in Boyd County, Kentucky
Churches in Boyd County, Kentucky
1867 establishments in Kentucky
Churches completed in 1867
Catlettsburg, Kentucky